The Colorado Springs Philharmonic is a professional orchestra based in Southern Colorado.

The current music director is Josep Caballé Domenech. The Philharmonic performs at the Pikes Peak Center in Colorado Springs, Colorado and offers several series each season, including classical and pops music.

History
The Colorado Springs Philharmonic was formed in 2003 following the bankruptcy of the Colorado Springs Symphony in March of that year. To fund the first season of the Philharmonic, a fund-raising drive was conducted between June and November, raising $834,986 from nearly 2,000 people. An additional $290,000 consisted of matching funds from the El Pomar Foundation, the Pikes Peak Community Foundation, the Joseph Henry Edmondson Foundation and the Bee Vradenburg Foundation. It maintained the musicians and musical director from the symphony with a "leaner and more innovative" business plan.

In 2008, Nathan Newbrough was made Executive Director. He focused on season ticket sales, types of performances and staffing to grow the Philharmonic. By 2011, the orchestra had begun to see improvements in audience size and more performances. Newbrough had increased the staff from 2 to 7 and offered family season tickets at discounted rates to draw in first-time audience members. The Philharmonic increased programming to exceed that of similarly sized cities. In addition, according to the League of American Orchestras, the Philharmonic had 70% more programming than other orchestras with the same budget. Newbrough credits the success of the organization on its music director, staff, and contributors like the El Pomar Foundation.

Lawrence Leighton Smith, the music director, stepped down in 2011 due to a diagnosis of Binswanger's Disease, a form of dementia. He had announced in 2009 his intention to step down at the end of the 2010/2011 season. He had been the conductor since 2002.

About 46% of the annual budget for the Philharmonic comes from contributions, and only about 2% of the contributions come from corporations. To increase involvement from local businesses and illustrate the value of cultural activities to the business community, the Philharmonic established the Business Partners Initiative in January, 2013. An advisory committee is led by Frank Caris, CEO of dpiX and board member of the Philharmonic. Caris said of the initiative: "Leaders in business share an interest in quality of life, essential to attracting and retaining a creative and driven workforce... The Philharmonic does so much to promote the quality of life in our region."

Performance series
Each season, the Philharmonic presents three primary series: El Pomar Foundation Masterworks, Philharmonic Pops, and Vanguard Performances. Masterworks, consists of seven classical music performances per season, sponsored by the El Pomar Foundation. Philharmonic Pops presents a broader spectrum of music designed to appeal to a variety of listeners, including pieces from Broadway and Hollywood. The Philharmonic Pops series has six concerts per season. The Boeing Vanguard Performances pairs genre-changing classical repertoire with film, acting, multimedia and photography. The Vanguard Performances comprise three concerts per season.

The Holiday series includes 3-4 concerts each season. In 2013, four free summer symphony concerts in June and July were made possible due to donations by five organizations: El Pomar Foundation, the City of Colorado Springs, El Paso County Enterprise Zone, and the Anschutz Foundation.  To commemorate the one year anniversary of the Waldo Canyon fire, a concert was performed on June 26, 2013, organized by Colorado Springs Together, a fire relief organization.

Enterprise Zone status
In 2009 the Philharmonic received Enterprise Zone status, which means that federal and state tax credits are given to donations. For instance, a $10,000 donation could be reduced to a net cost of $3,600 due to the tax credits. The credits encourage donations to Colorado nonprofit and business organizations, which help them to build infrastructure, hire and retain employees and make capital improvements.

References

External links 
Colorado Springs Philharmonic

Orchestras based in Colorado
Culture of Colorado Springs, Colorado
Performing arts in Colorado